The second quarter is due to air this quarter with the last defending champion of Quarter I will return for Quarter II.

Daily rounds 
Color Key:

Contender's Information:

Results Details:

Italicized names denotes a contender is a resbaker
DW denotes contender as the daily winner
DC denotes contender as the defending champion

 *due to the semi-finals, Kim Nemenzo (Visayas) will proceed to Quarter III.

Semifinals 
The semifinals will take place at the end of the second quarter which will determine the two grand finalists that will take place in 2019. The two grand finalists will receive a medal and an additional 150,000 cash, while the remaining contenders will receive additional 25,000. The score will be composed of 50% coming from the judges and 50% from the text and/or online votes. A semi-finalist may be "gonged" during this stage and be eliminated from the competition.

Summary of semifinalists 

*Inclusive of bonus prizes

Semifinal results 

The second quarter of the contest covered the months from October 2018 to January 2019. The week-long showdown took place on January 21–26, 2019.

Color Key:

 Group Performance: ("What's Up?")

John Mark Saga (Luzon) and John Michael dela Cerna (Mindanao) were announced as the 3rd and 4th grand finalists.

References
Notes

Scores

Sources

External links
 Tawag ng Tanghalan

Tawag ng Tanghalan seasons
2018 Philippine television seasons
2019 Philippine television seasons